The International Centre for Genetic Engineering and Biotechnology (ICGEB) was established as a project of the United Nations Industrial Development Organization (UNIDO) in 1983. The Organisation has three Component laboratories with over 45 ongoing research projects in Infectious and Non-communicable diseases, Medical, Industrial and Plant Biology Biotechnology in: Trieste, Italy, New Delhi, India and Cape Town, South Africa.

On February 3, 1994, under the direction of Arturo Falaschi the ICGEB became an autonomous International Organisation and now has over 65 Member States across world regions.

Its main pillars of action comprise: Research, Advanced Education through PhD and Postdoctoral Fellowships, International Scientific Meetings and Courses, competitive Grants for scientists in Member States and Technology Transfer to industry.

References

External links
ICGEB official Website

Genetic engineering
Intergovernmental organizations established by treaty
Organizations established in 1994
Scientific organisations based in Italy
Trieste
United Nations Industrial Development Organization
Italy and the United Nations
India and the United Nations
South Africa and the United Nations